Calhoun County is a county located in the U.S. state of Texas. As of the 2020 census, the population was 20,106. Its county seat is Port Lavaca. The county is named for John Caldwell Calhoun, the seventh vice president of the United States. Calhoun County comprises the Port Lavaca, TX Micropolitan Statistical Area, which is also included in the Victoria-Port Lavaca, TX Combined Statistical Area.

History

 Paleo-Indians Hunter-gatherers, and later Comanche, Tonkawa, and Karankawa tribes, first inhabitants.
 1685-1690 René-Robert Cavelier, Sieur de La Salle lands near Powderhorn Lake in Calhoun County.  France plants its flag on Texas soil, but departs after only  five years.
 1689 The future county is explored by Spaniards, including Alonso De León.
 1825 Martín De León of Mexico establishes a ranch near the old La Salle fort.
 1831 Linnville becomes the first Anglo settlement, established by Irish-born merchant, statesman, soldier John J. Linn.
 1840 Comanche Indians loot and sack Linnville.
 1842-1847 Empresario Henri Castro contracts to bring Alsatian immigrants from France, who use Port Lavaca as a holding site before moving on to settle Castroville in Medina County.
 1845 Thousands of German immigrants are stranded at port of disembarkation Indianaola on Matagorda Bay.
 1846 Calhoun County is formed from parts of Victoria, Jackson, and Matagorda counties.  It is named for then Chairman of the Senate Finance Committee John C. Calhoun. Lavaca was the first county seat.
 1852 Indianola becomes the county seat. The Morgan steamship lines  runs regular service from Indianola to New York City. Slave trading peaks at Indianola.
 1854 Poles begin to arrive in Indianaola.
 1858 Half Moon Reef Lighthouse is constructed in Matagorda Bay.
 1860 County population is 2,642, including 414 slaves.
 1861 Calhoun County 276-18 votes for secession from the Union. Contributes volunteer companies-to the Confederate cause. Fort Esperanza, on Matagorda Island is constructed by Confederate forces using slave labor.
 1862 Union gunboats bombard Port Lavaca.
 1875 A Gulf tropical storm heavily damages Indianola.
 1886 A hurricane destroys Indianola and causes much damage to Houston.
 1892 The Lutheran community of Olivia is established by Swedes.
 1909 Port O’Connor is established. The St. Louis, Brownsville and Mexico Railway establishes a terminus at Port O’Connor.
 1920 Port Lavaca builds a seawall to protect itself against hurricanes.
 1931 Lavaca Bay causeway is constructed.
 1934-1935 Oil and natural gas discovered near Port Lavaca.
 1947 Alcoa opens a plant at Point Comfort.
 1952 Union Carbide opens a plant near Seadrift.
 1961 Category 5 Hurricane Carla makes landfall between Port Lavaca and Port O’Connor.
 1983 Matagorda Island State Park and Wildlife Management Area is run by the Texas Parks and Wildlife Department under an agreement between the United States Department of the Interior and the state of Texas.

Geography
It borders the Gulf of Mexico.

Adjacent counties
 Jackson County (north)
 Matagorda County (east)
 (Gulf of Mexico) (southeast)
 Aransas County (southwest)
 Refugio County (west)
 Victoria County (northwest)

National protected area
 Aransas National Wildlife Refuge (part)

Demographics

As of the 2020 United States census, there were 20,106 people, 8,027 households, and 5,502 families residing in the county. As of the 2010 United States census, there were 21,381 people living in the county. 81.5% were White, 4.4% Asian, 2.6% Black or African American, 0.5% Native American, 8.8% of some other race and 2.1% of two or more races. 46.4% were Hispanic or Latino (of any race).

As of the census of 2000, there were 20,647 people, 7,442 households, and 5,574 families living in the county.  The population density was 40 people per square mile (16/km2).  There were 10,238 housing units at an average density of 20 per square mile (8/km2).  The racial makeup of the county was 78.04% White, 2.63% Black or African American, 0.49% Native American, 3.27% Asian, 0.07% Pacific Islander, 13.19% from other races, and 2.32% from two or more races.  40.92% of the population were Hispanic or Latino of any race. 11.4% were of German, 9.4% American and 5.5% English ancestry according to Census 2000. 67.9% spoke English, 29.1% Spanish and 1.2% Chinese as their first language.

There were 7,442 households, out of which 35.40% had children under the age of 18 living with them, 59.20% were married couples living together, 11.00% had a female householder with no husband present, and 25.10% were non-families. 21.30% of all households were made up of individuals, and 8.90% had someone living alone who was 65 years of age or older.  The average household size was 2.75 and the average family size was 3.20.

In the county, the population was spread out, with 28.50% under the age of 18, 8.70% from 18 to 24, 27.30% from 25 to 44, 22.30% from 45 to 64, and 13.30% who were 65 years of age or older.  The median age was 35 years. For every 100 females, there were 100.90 males.  For every 100 females age 18 and over, there were 99.70 males.

The median income for a household in the county was $35,849, and the median income for a family was $39,900. Males had a median income of $35,957 versus $19,772 for females. The per capita income for the county was $17,125.  About 12.70% of families and 16.40% of the population were below the poverty line, including 21.30% of those under age 18 and 11.70% of those age 65 or over.

Education
All of Calhoun County is served by the Calhoun County Independent School District.

Our Lady of the Gulf Catholic school, pre-K through grade 8, has also served the county since 1996.

Transportation

Major highways
  U.S. Highway 87
  State Highway 35
  State Highway 185

Airport
Calhoun County Airport, a general aviation airport, is located in unincorporated Calhoun County northwest of Port Lavaca.

Communities

Cities
 Point Comfort
 Port Lavaca (county seat)
 Seadrift

Census-designated places
 Alamo Beach
 Magnolia Beach
 Port O'Connor

Other unincorporated communities
 Long Mott

Ghost town
 Indianola

Politics

See also

 List of museums in the Texas Gulf Coast
 National Register of Historic Places listings in Calhoun County, Texas
 Recorded Texas Historic Landmarks in Calhoun County

References

External links
 Calhoun County government
 Calhoun County in Handbook of Texas Online at the University of Texas
 "Calhoun County Profile" from the Texas Association of Counties

 
1846 establishments in Texas
Populated places established in 1846
Hurricane Ike
Victoria, Texas metropolitan area